UEFA U-19 Championship 2006 (qualifying round) is the first round of qualifications for the Final Tournament of UEFA U-19 Championship 2006.  Top two teams from each group and the best third-placed team will enter UEFA U-19 Championship 2006 (Elite Round).

Matches

Group 1

Group 2

Group 3

Group 4

Group 5

Group 6

Group 7

Group 8

Group 9

Group 10

Group 11

Group 12

3rd Place table
The best third-placed team was determined by the results against the top two teams of the same group.

See also
2006 UEFA European Under-19 Championship
2006 UEFA European Under-19 Championship elite qualification

References

Qualification
UEFA European Under-19 Championship qualification